Seline may refer to:

 Seline, Croatia, a village in Croatia
 Seline (singer), South Korean singer, member of Cignature
 Seline Hizli, English actress

See also 
 Celine (disambiguation)
 Selin (disambiguation)
 Silene (disambiguation)
 Selene (disambiguation)